Abutaleb is both a surname and a given name. Notable people with the name include:

Ahmed Aboutaleb (born 1961), Morocco-born Dutch politician and journalist
Aboutaleb Talebi (1945–2008), Iranian Olympic wrestler
Yasmeen Abutaleb, American writer and journalist